Jean-Baptiste Doumeng (2 December 1919 - 6 April 1987), was a French businessman, politician and Communist. Doumeng was given the nickname "The Red Millionaire" for his business dealings with Eastern Bloc nations during the Cold War.

Career
Doumeng joined the French Communist Party at the age of 16 while a farmer in Noé, Haute-Garonne. At the age of 20 he founded Interagra, an agricultural trading concern that specialised in exporting food to the Soviet Union and Eastern bloc countries during the cold war.

He became one of the most important businessmen of the agrobusiness world. Doumeng controversially made his fortune by selling subsidized surplus produce to communist countries. Doumeng was also mayor of the town of Noé and a member of the General Council of Haute-Garonne in the 1970s.

Paying tribute at the time of his funeral, French communist official Gaston Plissonnier said: "This veteran of the Party, which passed all the storms, was especially an impassioned man. Impassioned by the country life, impassioned by the national interest (...). Above all deeply good, he could listen to the others. This man of honor did not take part in the organisational activity of the Party. He was with the service of the commercial relations of France with other countries, an international leader of the co-operative movement." Doumeng once said "I prefer to act for the international economic convergence, which selects me for a particular activity, rather than to assume a task of propaganda, say the word, in a medium condemned to remain pilot."

References

1919 births
1987 deaths
People from Haute-Garonne
French Communist Party politicians
French company founders
Mayors of places in Occitania (administrative region)
20th-century French businesspeople
20th-century French politicians
Departmental councillors (France)
Businesspeople in agriculture